Hinotiya Jagir may refer to:

 Hinotiya Jagir, Berasia, a village in Bhopal district of Madhya Pradesh, India
 Hinotiya Jagir, Huzur, a village in Bhopal district of Madhya Pradesh, India